The year 1860 in architecture involved some significant architectural events and new buildings.

Events
 August 22 – The Cenotaph to Matthew Henry, designed by Thomas Harrison, is unveiled in Chester, England.

Buildings and structures

Buildings opened

 Spring – Willden Fort, Utah, built by Charles William Willden and his son Ellott (no longer standing).
 June – Oxford University Museum of Natural History, designed by Benjamin Woodward.
 August 28 – St. Augustin, Coburg (Bavaria), consecrated by the Archbishop of Bamberg Michael Deinlein.
 November 22 – Solund Church, Norway, designed by Christian Henrik Grosch, consecrated by Bishop Jens Matthias Pram Kaurin.
 November 28 – Swedish Theatre, Helsinki, Finland, designed by Georg Theodor von Chiewitz.

Buildings completed
 Mosque of Omar, Bethlehem, Palestinian territories.
 Varshavsky railway station building in Saint Petersburg, Russia, designed by Piotr Salmanovich.
 Armour–Stiner House in Irvington, New York.

Awards
 RIBA Royal Gold Medal – Sydney Smirke

Births
 March 11 – Thomas Hastings, American architect (died 1929)
 May 2 – Lucien Weissenburger, French Art Nouveau architect (died 1929)
 August 20 – Kirtland Cutter, American architect (died 1939)
 date unknown – James Miller,  Scottish commercial architect based in Glasgow (died 1947)
 date unknown – Bertie Crewe, English architect (died 1937)

Deaths
 February 1 – Giacomo Moraglia, Milanese neoclassical architect (born 1791)
 February 19 – Edward Lapidge, English architect (born 1779)
 March 6 – Joseph Welland, Irish architect (born 1798)
 April 19 – Karol Podczaszyński, Polish neoclassical architect (born 1790)
 May 12 – Charles Barry, English architect best known for his role in the rebuilding of the Palace of Westminster (born 1795)
 October 10 – Thomas Larkins Walker, British-born architect (born 1811)

References

Architecture
Years in architecture
19th-century architecture